Bartlett's Bridge is a historic stone arch bridge carrying Clara Barton Road over the French River in Oxford, Massachusetts. Built in 1889, it is a rare example of late 19th-century stone bridge construction in the state. It was originally built to provide improved capacity for vehicles servicing a nearby textile mill complex. The bridge was listed on the National Register of Historic Places in 2000.

Description and history
Bartlett's Bridge is located in northern Oxford, in what is now a largely rural-residential area, carrying Clara Barton Road a short way west of its junction with Main Street. The facing of the bridge is rough-cut granite that has been fixed with mortar. In contrast, the granite stones that make up the arch have been very precisely worked.

The bridge was built in 1889 to a design by Charles A. Allen, at the time a civil engineer for the city of Worcester. The bridge was built to replace an older wooden span at the request of Edwin Bartlett, the owner of textile mills in North Oxford, whose businesses and employees would have used the road. Bartlett had originally requested that the town build an iron truss bridge, but it opted instead for one made of stone, which was completed by Worcester-based stonemasons in six months at a cost of $2200. Its construction precedes by a few years the state's first establishment of standards for highway bridge construction.

See also
List of bridges documented by the Historic American Engineering Record in Massachusetts
List of bridges on the National Register of Historic Places in Massachusetts
National Register of Historic Places in Worcester County, Massachusetts

References

External links

Bridges completed in 1889
Road bridges on the National Register of Historic Places in Massachusetts
Bridges in Worcester County, Massachusetts
Historic American Engineering Record in Massachusetts
National Register of Historic Places in Worcester County, Massachusetts
1889 establishments in Massachusetts
Stone arch bridges in the United States
Oxford, Massachusetts